Microtubule-associated protein RP/EB family member 1 is a protein that in humans is encoded by the MAPRE1 gene.

Function 

The protein encoded by this gene was first identified by its binding to the APC (Adenomatous polyposis coli) protein which is often mutated in familial and sporadic forms of colorectal cancer.

Immunofluorescence has demonstrated that EB1 localizes to the centrosome, mitotic spindle, and distal tips of cytoplasmic microtubules.  Throughout the cell cycle, EB1 proteins situate on the microtubule plus ends, which is why EB1 is categorized as a microtubule plus end tracking protein(+TIP protein).

The protein also associates with components of the dynactin complex and the intermediate chain of cytoplasmic dynein. Because of these associations, it is thought that this protein is involved in the regulation of microtubule structures and chromosome stability. This gene is a member of the RP/EB family.

Interactions 

MAPRE1 has been shown to interact with TERF1.

References

Further reading